Concord Hospital is a non-profit hospital located in the West End of Concord, New Hampshire. It is the principal site of the Concord Hospital regional health system which serves central New Hampshire, and is a clinical teaching site of the Dartmouth Geisel School of Medicine, New Hampshire's only medical school.

The hospital has "centers of excellence" in cardiac, cancer, orthopaedics, urology and women's health services, serving as a regional referral resource, and its level II Trauma Center designation certifies that the hospital has the resources to provide a level of care for patients with a wide range of injuries. Concord Hospital Medical Group, the administrating organization of Concord Hospital and affiliated institutions, consists of over 345 clinical providers in 28 sub-specialties at 35 locations.

History
The Concord Hospital Association was founded in 1884, to provide care to the poor and sick of the Concord area. George A. Pillsbury, father of Pillsbury Company co-founder Charles Pillsbury, provided a gift of nearly $60,000 to the association for the construction of a charitable hospital. Margaret Pillsbury General Hospital, named after George's wife in honor of their 50th wedding anniversary, was opened on December 15, 1891. In 1896, another hospital, the Memorial Hospital for Women and Children, was opened to provide care for poor women and children. The two hospitals merged in 1946 to become Concord Hospital. As part of the merger, the Concord Hospital School of Nursing was established, remaining in operation until 1989. In the summer of 2019 Concord Hospital was upgraded to a Level II Trauma Center after years of upgrades and preparations, followed shortly by the opening of the Memorial building, which added new operating rooms, office space, and patient beds.  In 2021, the hospital received final approval to purchase Lakes Region General Hospital and Franklin Regional Hospital due to the latters' bankruptcy following the COVID-19 pandemic. After successful acquisition, the two hospitals were renamed to Concord Hospital-Laconia and Concord Hospital-Franklin, thus establishing a unified healthcare network in central New Hampshire.

Rankings & recognitions
Concord Hospital is one of only three ranked regional medical centers in New Hampshire by U.S. News & World Report, and is currently ranked second in the state behind Dartmouth-Hitchcock Medical Center. In 2022, it was rated "high performing" in 7 procedures and conditions including lung cancer surgery, heart attack, heart failure, and kidney failure.

Community benefits
In fiscal year 2017, Concord Hospital invested $51,513,840 of its annual budget to provide community benefit programs and services, which included $26,970,136 to specifically respond to the community health needs identified in the most recent Capital Region Health Needs Assessment conducted in 2015. In addition, the Concord Hospital Trust provided $2,688,670 in funding to support the hospital's charitable mission and the needs of vulnerable populations for a total of charitable investment of more than $54 million.

Notable persons
 Joseph Avellone, surgeon
 James M. Langley, first president of Concord Hospital
 Susan Lynch, pediatrician

References

External links
Official website
Concord Hospital Trust website

Hospital buildings completed in 1891
Hospital buildings completed in 1896
Hospitals in Concord, New Hampshire